is a Japanese gravure idol, tarento, and actress represented by Space Craft.

Biography
In 2006, Nishida was awarded the Grand Prix prize of Space Craft Group's "Mizugi Gravure Audition" among 3,152 people. Her gravure debut was on Weekly Young Sunday and was chosen as the 2006 Miss of the second semester in the YS Maiden Academy.

Nishida served as an image model for the fashion brand KIKS TYO.

Filmography

TV series

Radio series

Advertisements

Internet series

Mobile series

Music videos

Films

References

External links
 
Official Instagram profile (in Japanese)

Japanese gravure idols
Japanese television personalities
Japanese actresses
1989 births
Living people
People from Kyoto Prefecture